A Noisy Household, is a 1946 Soviet comedy film directed by Mikhail Zharov.

Plot 
A Red Army soldier Ogurtsov, in the pre-war past, an amateur breeder, goes to a new duty station. Making his way through the forest path, he hears girlish singing, goes to his voice and meets a girl. This turns out to be Tonya   a strict girl in the rank of corporal. It turns out that they are sent to the same subdivision   to the farm of Semibab. Arriving at the object, they see a foreman playing the accordion and singing a song. It does not immediately become clear that this foreman is the head of the object, guard foreman Semibab. The new arrivals see a non-standard airfield and have no idea what their object is.

Cast 
 Lyudmila Tselikovskaya as Antonina   Kalmykova
 Aleksandr Grave as Tikhon   Ogurtsov
 Mikhail Zharov as Semibab
 Vitali Doronin as Ivan Kroshkin
 Yuri Lyubimov as Jacques Larochelle
 Vladimir Balashov as Durand  
 Georgy Svetlani as Sorokonozhkin  
 Vladimir Uralskiy as Gvozdaryov  
 Sergey Filippov as Krauss  
  Mikhail Pugovkin as Soldier Pugovkin (uncredited)

References

External links 
  

1946 films
1940s Russian-language films
Soviet war comedy films
1940s war comedy films
Soviet black-and-white films
Mosfilm films
1946 comedy films
Soviet World War II films
Russian World War II films